William Henry Edwards (August 7, 1857 – January 18, 1950) was an Ontario leather manufacturer and political figure. He represented Toronto Northwest and then Bellwoods in the Legislative Assembly of Ontario from 1924 to 1929 as a Conservative member.

Background
Edwards was born in Dover, England, the son of John Edwards, came to Canada West with his family in 1862 and was educated in Toronto. He was a prominent businessman in the city as proprietor of J.E. Edwards & Sons Leather Good Manufacturers. He was also known as a mining pioneer working with Adam Wright in the early days of Cobalt, Ontario. In 1887, he married Elizabeth Ann Kerslake. Together they raised two children, a son and a daughter. He died in 1950.

Politics
Edwards was a prominent member of the Conservative Party establishment in Toronto. He was the first president of the South York riding association and also served as president for West York.

He was elected in 1924 in a by-election in the riding of Toronto Northwest. He defeated his only opponent, J.A. Young of the Labor party by 5,997 votes. Pundits remarked that the voter turnout was unusually light with less than 10,000 votes cast. He was re-elected in the 1926 provincial election in the newly created riding of Bellwoods. He defeated Arthur Frost of the Labour-Prohibitionist Party by 4,622 votes. He declined to run in the 1929 election.

References

External links 
 

1857 births
1950 deaths
People from Dover, Kent
Politicians from Toronto
Progressive Conservative Party of Ontario MPPs